Tales of the Black Widow Company is a game supplement for BattleTech published by FASA in 1985.

Contents
Tales of the Black Widow Company is a supplement describing the mercenary company known as The Black Widow Company of Wolf's Dragoons. Tales of the Black Widow Company describes the history, organization, mechwarriors and BattleMechs of Natasha Kerensky and her mercenary unit; it also includes 12 miniscenarios.

Publication history
Tales of the Black Widow Company was written by Jordan Weisman, L. Ross Babcock III, Patrick Larkin, Richard Meyer, J. Andrew Keith, and William H. Keith, Jr., with a cover by Jim Holloway, and was published by FASA in 1985 as a 48-page book.

Shannon Appelcline stated that FASA was "looking into how to market Battletech more like an RPG, with more constant releases than a normal wargame could support" and that "This new strategy started off with saddle-stitched books of wargaming scenarios such as Tales of the Black Widow's Company (1985) and The Fox's Teeth (1985)."

Reviews
White Wolf #7 (1987)

References

BattleTech supplements